In railway engineering, "gauge" is the transverse distance between the inner surfaces of the heads of two rails, which for the vast majority of railway lines is the number of rails in place. However, it is sometimes necessary for track to carry railway vehicles with wheels matched to two different gauges. Such track is described as dual gauge – achieved either by addition of a third rail, if it will fit, or by two additional rails. Dual-gauge tracks are more expensive to configure with signals and sidings, and to maintain, than two separate single-gauge tracks. It is therefore usual to build dual-gauge or other multi-gauge tracks only when necessitated by lack of space or when tracks of two different gauges meet in marshalling yards or passenger stations. Dual-gauge tracks are by far the most common configuration, but triple-gauge tracks have been built in some situations.

Background

The rail gauge is the most fundamental specification of a railway. Rail tracks and wheelsets are built within engineering tolerances that allow optimum lateral movement of the wheelsets between the rails. Pairs of rails that become too wide or narrow in gauge will cause derailments, especially if in excess of normal gauge-widening on curves. 

Given the requirement for gauge to be within very tight limits, when the designed distance between the pair of wheels on a wheelset differs even slightly from that of others on a railway, track must be built to two specific gauges. That is achieved in a variety of ways: most commonly by adding a third rail, more rarely by adding another pair of rails; and rarer still, when three gauges are present, by four rails.

Configurations

Dual-gauge track can consist of three rails, sharing one "common" rail; or four rails, with the rails of the narrower gauge lying between those of the broader gauge. In the three-rail configuration, wear and tear of the common rail is greater than with the two other outer rails. In dual gauge lines, turnouts (railroad switches) are more complex than in single-gauge track, and trains must be safely signalled on both of the gauges. Track circuits and mechanical interlocking must also operate on both gauges.

Multi-gauge track is very often associated with a break-of-gauge station, where rail vehicles or vehicle contents are transferred from one gauge to another. A break of gauge causes delay and increases congestion, especially on single-track lines. Essentially, two trains are required to do what a single train would normally accomplish. When traffic passes mainly in one direction, full wagons taken to the border have to be returned as empties, and a train of empty wagons has to be brought to the break of gauge from the other side to fetch the cargo. Congestion is also caused by unloading and reloading. The problem is worsened when there is a disparity between the capacity of locomotives and vehicles on the two gauges: typically, one broad-gauge trainload needs three narrow-gauge trains to carry.

Dual gauge (three rails)

Constructing dual-gauge track with three rails is possible when the two adjacent rails can be separated by at least the space required by rail fastening hardware such as spikes and or rail clips – typically . If the two gauges are closer than that, four rails must be used.

Dual gauge (four rails)

There are many places where gauge dimensions of two different railway systems are too close to allow a three-rail configuration, including:
In such cases, four rails are needed for dual gauge. In addition, four rails may result from an engineering preference when three rails would suffice: an example is on the Chemin de Fer de la Baie de Somme (Somme Bay railway), which combines standard and metre gauge –  different, well within the parameters for three rails. 

Four rails can also be deployed where it is essential to have the centre-line of all rail vehicles aligned with the centre-line of the track. Examples are:
 in constricted tunnels
 passenger platforms, where for reasons of safety and comfort the step taken by the passenger must be within uniform limits
 on turntables, which must present identical positioning of rails at both ends, requiring all four rails to be aligned to the central axis.

Triple gauge

In rare situations, three different gauges may converge on to a rail yard and triple-gauge track is needed to meet the operational needs of the break-of-gauge station – most commonly where there is insufficient space to do otherwise. Construction and operation of triple-gauge track and its signalling, however, involves immense cost and disruption, and is undertaken when no other alternative is available.

The following table shows localities where triple gauge has been necessary.

More than three gauges

Three gauges are the maximum found on operating railway lines and in railway yards, but some rolling stock manufacturers collocate more than three lines in their works, depending on the particular gauges of their customers.

Alternatives to dual-gauge track

Transfer of freight and passengers between different gauges does not necessarily involve dual-gauge track: there may simply be two tracks that approach either side of a platform without overlapping. In Australia, 13 break-of-gauge stations existed by 1945 as a result of longstanding interstate rivalries: three different gauges had persisted since the 1850s and the five mainland state capitals were not linked by standard gauge until 1995. Huge costs and long delays were imposed by Trans-shipment of freight at break-of-gauge stations, whether manually, by gantry crane or by wheelset or bogie exchange.</ref> During World War II, breaks of gauge in Australia added immense difficulty to the war effort by needing extra locomotives and rolling stock, and more than 1600 service personnel and a large pool of civilians, at transfer points for an annual average transfer of about 1.8 million tonnes of freight. 

To cost and inefficiency was added, in the case of passengers, considerable inconvenience. In 1896, at Albury station on the Sydney–Melbourne railway, famed American writer Samuel Clemens (Mark Twain) had to change trains in the middle of a "biting-cold" night in 1896 and there formed his pungent view of "the paralysis of intellect that gave that idea birth".

In some locations, an alternative to building long lengths of dual-gauge track has been to change the wheels on rolling stock, either by dropping and changing wheelsets from four-wheeled vehicles or exchanging bogies (US: trucks) under eight-wheeled vehicles. With this arrangement, a short length of dual-gauge track is only needed within the facility. A benefit is that the contents of fully loaded cars are not disturbed. The scheme was first adopted on the French–Spanish border and in Poland. It introduces delay into transit times compared with dual-gauge operation, but is much quicker than trans-shipping: when introduced in 1962 in Melbourne, Australia, on the route between Sydney and Adelaide, the freight handling time per train dropped from five days to less than two. The process involved disconnecting the brake rigging and bogie centre pins have to be disconnected before the vehicle is lifted and new bogies are wheeled underneath.

In Europe, a similar principle embodies low-profile, small-wheeled transporter wagons, which carry vehicles built for one gauge on a line with a different gauge. A variant is the rollbock (Rollböcke in German), used under two-axle standard-gauge vehicles: each wheelset is carried on a small four-wheeled narrow-gauge trolley. The entire train is converted in minutes at a slow walking pace, each rollbock being automatically matched to its wheelset from underneath.  

A further variant is "train on train", in which an entire narrow-gauge train is carried on standard-gauge flatcars on which continuous rail has been fitted.

In Spain, change-over facilities are extensive, since although  track predominates, and high-speed lines are laid to  standard gauge, there are many lines with narrower gauges ( and others).

Dual-gauge railways by nation

Australia
Until 2008, there was a dual-gauge line between Wodonga and Bandiana.

A dual-gauge line was within Tocumwal railway station until 1988, when the standard gauge component was put out of use.

In 1900, in South Australia, a three-rail dual-gauge system was proposed in order to avoid a break of gauge. After twenty years of discord, the proposal was abandoned. Much later, the South Australian Railways successfully adopted dual-gauge turnouts.

Dual-gauge track is also used from the triangle at Woodbridge to Cockburn Junction, then to Kwinana on one branch and North Fremantle on the other. The signalling system detects the gauge of the approaching train and puts the signals to stop if the route is set for the wrong gauge. 

Freight trains to the Port of Brisbane utilise the dual gauge Fisherman Islands line that runs parallel to the Cleveland railway line from Park Road to Lindum. Passenger trains use the dual-gauge section of the Beenleigh railway line running parallel to the electric suburban narrow gauge of the Queensland Rail city network over the Merivale Bridge into platforms 2 and 3 at Roma Street Station. This is used by standard gauge interstate New South Wales TrainLink XPT services to Sydney. In 2012, a dual-gauge line was installed between Acacia Ridge and Bromelton to serve a new freight hub at Bromelton.

Bangladesh
 The Bangladesh Railway uses three rails to avoid breaks of gauge on its broad-gauge and metre-gauge lines. The Jamuna Bridge and Padma Bridge, which link the east–west and north–south rail systems respectively, have four-rail dual-gauge tracks. Of the  Bangladseh Railway system, about  has four-rail dual-gauge.  

Belgium
 Tram tracks in Brussels once combined  lines for inter-urban trams and  lines for urban trams in a three-rail layout. In 1991, the interurban trams went out of service and then the network used only standard-gauge track.

Bulgaria
 The Sofia tramway uses a mixture of narrow and standard gauge. A  section of track between Krasna polyana depot and Pirotska street is dual-gauge shared by  route 22 and  route 11.

Czech Republic
In the Czech Republic, there is 2 km of dual gauge  and  track near Jindřichův Hradec. In 1985, its original four rails were converted to three rails. In 2004, in Jindřichův Hradec at a switch where a dual gauge railway bifurcates, a Junák express from Plzeň to Brno derailed due to a signalling error. The standard gauge train had been switched on to the narrow gauge track.

France
 The Chemin de Fer de la Baie de Somme in France is dual gauge between Noyelles-sur-Mer and Saint-Valery-sur-Somme. The line has four rails with metre gauge laid within standard gauge. There are some dual-gauge (standard and Iberian) sidings at Cerbère on the Spanish border.

Germany
 In the 1970s, the Stuttgarter Straßenbahnen tram lines underwent a gauge conversion from  gauge to standard gauge. This was part of an upgrade to the Stuttgart Stadtbahn. In 1981,  and  dual-gauge track was constructed so that new DT-8 Stadtbahn cars and old trams could share the network. In 2008, a further gauge conversion was completed. The Stuttgart Straßenbahn Museum operates  gauge trams on weekends and special occasions.

In Krefeld on Ostwall, Germany, tram lines are dual gauge so that standard  Rheinbahn U76 Stadtbahn cars and  gauge trams may share the lines. At the north end of the route, at the junction with Rheinstraße, the trams reverse. There, the standard gauge line ends, while the metre gauge lines continue. At the Hauptbahnhof, on Oppumer Straße, dual gauge track continues. At the ends of Oppumer Straße, the two tracks diverge.

In Mülheim there is a similar situation. The Duisburg tram line 901 meets the local line 102. The tram system in Duisburg uses  gauge track while the tram route from Witten to Mülheim uses  gauge tracks. Two lines share a tunnel section between the Mülheim (Ruhr) Hauptbahnhof and Schloss Broich then diverge at street level.

The tram network between Werne to Bad Honnef is large with various operators and gauges. The trams in Wuppertal used  gauge track on eastwest lines and  gauge track on northsouth lines. Trams in Duisburg used  gauge track on lines south of the Ruhr and  gauge tracks on lines north of the Ruhr. The north lines closed in the 1960s and 1970s. Duisburg's three routes were converted to  gauge track.

Ghana
 Ghana is converting its narrow gauge to standard gauge, and is installing dual-gauge sleepers as an intermediate stage.

Greece
 In Greece, the line between Athens and Elefsis (now closed) was dual gauge in order to allow the  gauge trains of the Peloponnese rail network to pass. It also allowed standard gauge trains to reach the Elefsis shipyards. In Volos, a short section of track between the main station and the harbour used an unusual triple gauge, to accommodate standard gauge trains from Larissa, metre gauge trains from Kalambaka, and the  gauge trains of the Pelion railway.

Indonesia
 In 1899, in the Dutch East Indies, dual gauge track was installed between Yogyakarta and Solo. The track was owned by the Nederlandsch-Indische Spoorweg Maatschappij, a private company, which in 1867 had built the  gauge line. The third rail was installed to allow passengers and goods travelling over the    gauge Staatsspoorweg (state railway) a direct connection. At a later date, the government constructed new tracks to allow greater capacity and higher speeds. In 1940, a third rail was installed between Solo and Gundih on the line to Semarang, allowing  gauge trains to travel between Semarang, Solo and Yogyakarta via Gambringan, on the line to Surabaya instead of on the original line via Kedungjati.

Until the 1970s, a short section of dual gauge  and  line existed in North Sumatra on a joint line of the Deli Railway and the Atjeh Tram.

Some sugar mill railways in Java have dual-gauge sections.

Ireland
The Dublin & Drogheda Railway underwent a gauge conversion because the gauges were too close to allow a dual-gauge line.

Italy

Japan
 In Japan, the national standard is  narrow gauge. Dual gauge is used where the  Shinkansen (bullet train) lines join the main network. For example, part of the Ōu Main Line became part of the Akita Shinkansen and was converted to dual gauge in a limited section. The longest dual gauge section in Japan is near, and in, the Seikan Tunnel. Sections of the Hakone Tozan Line are among a number of other dual-gauge lines.

Mexico
 Mexico previously had  and  dual gauge track.

Netherlands
For the 1939 centennial celebration, an exact replica of the country's first locomotive "De Arend" was built using the original blueprints. Since 1953, the locomotive is housed at the Dutch National Railway Museum, where in recent years, a dual-gauge track has been constructed in the rail yard, allowing for the locomotive to drive back and forth on special occasions.

Poland
It is served by narrow-gauge passenger trains and standard-gauge freight trains.

Russia
 Between 2008 and 2012, a  dual-gauge cross-border track was rebuilt between Khasan, Russia, and Rajin, North Korea; its gauges were the Russian  and Korean .

Spain
Some dual-gauge  sidings are at Port Bou on the French border.

Sweden
 The bridges at the borders of Sweden and Finland, between Haparanda and Tornio have  of dual gauge,  and  track. At each end of the dual-gauge section are yards with standard and Finnish gauge areas to allow for trans-shipment. Four rails are used because the gauges are close and the bridge structure is wider than normal to allow for the offset from the centreline of each gauge. A Rafil gauge changer is at the Tornio yard. Similar arrangements exist on the approach to Kaliningrad, where  track extends from the Polish border with some sections of dual gauge.

Switzerland
 In Switzerland, dual-gauge  track and  track exists between Lucerne and Horw of the Zentralbahn, between Niederbipp and Oberbipp of the Oberaargau-Jura Railways and between Chur and Domat/Ems of RhB. All three allow narrow-gauge passenger trains and standard-gauge freight trains to operate. The former Zollikofen - Worblaufen - Deisswil dual gauge was cut back to Papiermühle, when the factory in Deisswil closed. 

United Kingdom
 The Great Western Railway in Britain was originally built to a broad gauge of 2134 mm (7 ft 0 in), subsequently widened to 2140 mm (7 ft 0 in). A dual-gauge system was easily installed as the gauges were well separated and the line had wooden sleepers. A short section of broad and standard gauge is at the Great Western Society site at Didcot.

The port authority in Derry, Northern Ireland used a dual-gauge line in a street-level network to transfer freight. Two of the city's stations were on a narrow  gauge. The other two city stations were on broad  gauge.

United States
 In Los Angeles, the  Los Angeles Railway and  Pacific Electric Railway ran on dual gauge track on some downtown streets.

From 1880 to 1902, the Burlington, Cedar Rapids and Northern Railway (standard gauge) and the Burlington and Northwestern Railway (narrow gauge) shared a dual-gauge mainline from Burlington, Iowa to Mediapolis,  to the north.

The early operational years of the State Belt Railroad in San Francisco featured dual-gauge tracks to accommodate regional railroads of the time, which interchanged via ferry.

Until 1941, the Colorado and Southern Railway used both standard-gauge and narrow-gauge tracks, and had a dual-gauge line between Denver and Golden, Colorado.

Until the 1960s, the Denver and Rio Grande Western Railroad's Alamosa–Durango Line from Alamosa, Colorado to Antonito was dual-gauge.

Previously, in its Mount Union, Pennsylvania yard, the East Broad Top Railroad and Coal Company used dual-gauge tracks.

Vietnam
Other smaller dual-gauge sections exist elsewhere in the north-east of the country.

See also

 Broad-gauge railway
 Gauntlet track
 Glossary of rail transport terms
 History of rail transport
 Rail transport
 Rail transport by country
 Tamping machines
 Track gauge conversion

Notes

Notes to gallery photos

References

Further reading

External links
 Jane's World Railways (hard copy)
 Jindřichův Hradec Local Railways
 Jindřichohradecké úzké mainly in Czech
 South Australia – Rail Revitalisation Project  registration: a free registration is required to access the source.
 Columbus' streetcar track gauge
 

 

de:Gleis#Mehrschienengleise